In geometry, the triapeirogonal tiling (or trigonal-horocyclic tiling) is a uniform tiling of the hyperbolic plane with a Schläfli symbol of r{∞,3}.

Uniform colorings
The half-symmetry form, has two colors of triangles:

Related polyhedra and tiling 

This hyperbolic tiling is topologically related as a part of sequence of uniform quasiregular polyhedra with vertex configurations (3.n.3.n), and [n,3] Coxeter group symmetry.

See also

List of uniform planar tilings
Tilings of regular polygons
Uniform tilings in hyperbolic plane

References

 John H. Conway, Heidi Burgiel, Chaim Goodman-Strass, The Symmetries of Things 2008,  (Chapter 19, The Hyperbolic Archimedean Tessellations)

External links 

 http://bendwavy.org/klitzing/incmats/o3xinfino.htm
  o3x∞o

Apeirogonal tilings
Hyperbolic tilings
Isogonal tilings
Isotoxal tilings
Uniform tilings